Kayne Turner (born 31 December 1995) is a professional Australian rules footballer playing the North Melbourne Football Club in the Australian Football League (AFL).

Early life
Turner participated in the Auskick program at Wodonga Showgrounds in Wodonga, Victoria.
He completed most of his secondary education at Tallangatta Secondary College in North East Victoria before finishing his Year 12 over two years at Maribyrnong Secondary College sports academy 

Turner played junior football for the Murray Bushrangers in the TAC Cup as well as senior football for the Kiewa Sandy Creek football club in the Tallangatta & District Football League.

He was drafted to North Melbourne with pick 25 in the 2014 AFL rookie draft.

AFL Career 

He was the youngest player on an AFL list during the 2014 AFL season.

Personal life
On 22 May 2016, Turner was charged with drink driving after recording a blood alcohol content of 0.133 when pulled over by Victoria Police in Ryall Street, North Melbourne.

References

External links

1995 births
Living people
North Melbourne Football Club players
Werribee Football Club players
Murray Bushrangers players
Australian rules footballers from Victoria (Australia)